Paulraj is a surname.  Notable people with the surname include:

 Arogyaswami Paulraj (born 1944), Indian-American electrical engineer
 S. Paulraj, Indian politician

Indian surnames